Sharsha is an upazila of Jessore District in the Division of Khulna, Bangladesh.

Geography
It has 46,084 households and a total area of 336.34 km2.

Sharsha Upazila is bounded by Bagdah  CD Block in North 24 Parganas district in West Bengal, India and Chaugachha, upazila on the north, Jhikargachha  upazila on the east, Kalaroa upazila on the south and Bangaon and Gaighata CD Blocks in North 24 Parganas district in West Bengal, India, on the west.

Demographics
According to the 2011 Bangladesh census, Sharsha had a population of 341,565. Males constituted 49.82% of the population and females 50.18%. Muslims formed 97.42% of the population, Hindus 2.47%, Christians 0.08% and others 0.03%. Sharsha had a literacy rate of 49.76% for the population 7 years and above.

According to the 1991 Bangladesh census, Sharsha had a population of 258,789. Males comprised 51.4% of the population, and females 48.6%. The population aged 18 or over was 126,532. Sharsha had an average literacy rate of 25.5% (7+ years), compared to the national average of 32.4%.

Administration
Sharsha Upazila is divided into one Municipality and 11 union parishads.

Municipality:
 Benapole Municipality

Union Parishads:
 Sharsha
 Bagachra
 Bahadurpur
 Benapole
 Dihi
 Goga
 Kayba
 Lakshmanpur
 Nizampur
 Putkhali
 Ulashi
The union parishads are subdivided into 135 mauzas and 168 villages.

Benapole Municipality is subdivided into 9 wards and 12 mahallas.

See also
 Upazilas of Bangladesh
 Districts of Bangladesh
 Divisions of Bangladesh

References

Upazilas of Jessore District
Jashore District
Khulna Division